Xu Wen, born April 13, 1986 in Shanghai), is a versatile Chinese footballer, who plays as either a defensive midfielder or defender.

Club career
As a youngster Xu Wen would participate in the 2005 National Games of China as well as playing for the Shanghai Shenhua youth team before he would graduate to the senior team during the 2006 league season where he was given the number 25 shirt. A toe injury would see his progression halted before the merger with Shanghai United F.C. and the significant increase in the squad size saw him return to youth and reserve teams. He would leave the club to gain more playing opportunities and join second tier side Nanchang Bayi where during the 2009 league season he would establish himself as a vital member within the teams push for promotion to the top tier when they came runners-up in the division.

Club career stats
Statistics accurate as of match played 22 October 2016

References

External links
Player stats at sohu.com

1986 births
Living people
Chinese footballers
Footballers from Shanghai
Shanghai Shenhua F.C. players
Shanghai Shenxin F.C. players
Chinese Super League players
China League One players
Association football defenders
Association football midfielders